Pavilion Theatre is a theatre, cinema and arts centre in Dún Laoghaire, Ireland.

History
Pavilion Theatre was founded in 1903, under the name of the Pavilion & Gardens Kingstown Ltd., with a stage measuring 83 × 24 feet (25 × 7 m). John McCormack performed in 1908. In 1915 the Pavilion burned down. By the 1930s it was only a cinema, with no plays being shown. In 1940 it burned down again. The introduction of television led to a decline, and the last film shown for a long time was No Sex Please, We're British in 1974. In the 1980s, Planxty recorded two programmes for RTÉ at the Pavilion, and acts such as De Dannan, The Dubliners and the Dublin Ballet Company also performed at the venue.

The Pavilion was closed in 1984 as a result of the enforcement of new fire regulations introduced with the Fire Acts of 1981 and 1982, and reopened in 2001 as a new 324-seat building. It is operated by Pavilion Theatre Management Company and owned by Dún Laoghaire-Rathdown County Council. It employs six full-time and 12 casual staff.

Gallery

References

External links
Official site

Theatres in Dún Laoghaire–Rathdown
1903 establishments in Ireland